In enzymology, a formimidoylaspartate deiminase is an enzyme that catalyzes the chemical reaction

N-formimidoyl-L-aspartate + H2O  N-formyl-L-aspartate + NH3

Thus, the two substrates of this enzyme are N-formimidoyl-L-aspartate and H2O, whereas its two products are N-formyl-L-aspartate and NH3.

This enzyme belongs to the family of hydrolases, those acting on carbon-nitrogen bonds other than peptide bonds, specifically in linear amidines.  The systematic name of this enzyme class is N-formimidoyl-L-aspartate iminohydrolase. This enzyme is also called formiminoaspartate deiminase.  This enzyme participates in histidine metabolism.

References

 

EC 3.5.3
Enzymes of unknown structure